There are about 83 known moth species of Liberia. The moths (mostly nocturnal) and butterflies (mostly diurnal) together make up the taxonomic order Lepidoptera.

This is a list of moth species which have been recorded in Liberia.

Arctiidae
Alpenus maculosa (Stoll, 1781)
Amerila brunnea (Hampson, 1901)
Amerila luteibarba (Hampson, 1901)
Balacra caeruleifascia Walker, 1856
Balacra ehrmanni (Holland, 1893)
Balacra elegans Aurivillius, 1892
Ceryx hilda (Ehrmann, 1894)
Creatonotos leucanioides Holland, 1893
Metarctia metaleuca Hampson, 1914
Muxta xanthopa (Holland, 1893)
Neuroxena flammea (Schaus, 1893)
Nyctemera apicalis (Walker, 1854)
Spilosoma aurantiaca (Holland, 1893)
Spilosoma rava (Druce, 1898)
Spilosoma sulphurea Bartel, 1903

Cossidae
Macrocossus caducus Clench, 1959

Drepanidae
Epicampoptera strandi Bryk, 1913
Negera bimaculata (Holland, 1893)
Spidia fenestrata Butler, 1878

Geometridae
Traminda vividaria (Walker, 1861)
Zamarada anna D. S. Fletcher, 1974
Zamarada antimima D. S. Fletcher, 1974
Zamarada bicuspida D. S. Fletcher, 1974
Zamarada corroborata Herbulot, 1954
Zamarada cucharita D. S. Fletcher, 1974
Zamarada dolorosa D. S. Fletcher, 1974
Zamarada dyscapna D. S. Fletcher, 1974
Zamarada eucharis (Drury, 1782)
Zamarada euphrosyne Oberthür, 1912
Zamarada ilaria Swinhoe, 1904
Zamarada indicata D. S. Fletcher, 1974
Zamarada ixiaria Swinhoe, 1904
Zamarada leona Gaede, 1915
Zamarada lepta D. S. Fletcher, 1974
Zamarada paxilla D. S. Fletcher, 1974
Zamarada perlepidata (Walker, 1863)
Zamarada platycephala D. S. Fletcher, 1974
Zamarada regularis D. S. Fletcher, 1974
Zamarada subinterrupta Gaede, 1915

Lasiocampidae
Cheligium sansei Zolotuhin & Gurkovich, 2009
Euphorea ondulosa (Conte, 1909)
Filiola dogma Zolotuhin & Gurkovich, 2009
Gelo jordani (Tams, 1936)
Gonopacha brotoessa (Holland, 1893)
Leipoxais siccifolia Aurivillius, 1902
Mallocampa leucophaea (Holland, 1893)
Odontocheilopteryx phoneus Hering, 1928
Pachyna subfascia (Walker, 1855)
Pachytrina gliharta Zolotuhin & Gurkovich, 2009
Pseudometa pagetodes Tams, 1929
Sonitha libera (Aurivillius, 1914)

Lymantriidae
Dasychira castor Hering, 1926
Rahona watsoni Dall'Asta, 1981

Noctuidae
Achaea ezea (Cramer, 1779)
Asota speciosa (Drury, 1773)
Heraclia geryon (Fabricius, 1781)
Phaegorista leucomelas (Herrich-Schäffer, 1855)

Notodontidae
Eurystaura obscura Gaede, 1928
Tricholoba squalidula Strand, 1911

Psychidae
Eumeta cervina Druce, 1887
Eumeta salae Heylaerts, 1884

Pterophoridae
Agdistis tamaricis (Zeller, 1847)
Megalorhipida leucodactylus (Fabricius, 1794)

Saturniidae
Epiphora boolana Strand, 1909

Sphingidae
Avinoffia hollandi (Clark, 1917)
Hippotion irregularis (Walker, 1856)
Lycosphingia hamatus (Dewitz, 1879)
Nephele discifera Karsch, 1891
Phylloxiphia bicolor (Rothschild, 1894)
Phylloxiphia formosa (Schultze, 1914)
Phylloxiphia goodii (Holland, 1889)
Phylloxiphia vicina (Rothschild & Jordan, 1915)
Platysphinx constrigilis (Walker, 1869)
Polyptychoides digitatus (Karsch, 1891)
Polyptychus carteri (Butler, 1882)
Polyptychus lapidatus Joicey & Kaye, 1917
Polyptychus murinus Rothschild, 1904
Polyptychus paupercula (Holland, 1889)
Polyptychus trisecta (Aurivillius, 1901)
Pseudoclanis admatha Pierre, 1985
Theretra jugurtha (Boisduval, 1875)

Tineidae
Tinea subalbidella Stainton, 1867

Zygaenidae
Tascia instructa (Walker, 1854)

See also 
 List of butterflies of Liberia

General:
 Wildlife of Liberia

References

External links 

Liberia
Moths
Liberia
Liberia